The 1979–80 Eintracht Frankfurt season was the 80th season in the club's football history. In 1974–75 the club played in the Bundesliga, the top tier of German football. It was the club's 17th season in the Bundesliga.

The season ended up with Eintracht winning the UEFA Cup for the first time.

Matches

Legend

Friendlies

Bundesliga

League fixtures and results

League table

DFB-Pokal

UEFA Cup

Final

First leg

Second leg

3–3 on aggregate. Eintracht Frankfurt won on away goals.

Squad

Squad and statistics

|}

Notes

References

Sources

External links
 Official English Eintracht website 
 German archive site
 1979–80 Bundesliga season at Fussballdaten.de 

1979-80
German football clubs 1979–80 season
1979-80 Eintracht Frankfurt Season